Christopher Dawson or Chris Dawson may refer to:
Chris Dawson (businessman) (born 1952), British businessman, founder and chief executive officer of The Range
Chris Dawson (footballer, born 1994), English-born Welsh footballer 
Chris Dawson (footballer, born 1979), English-born Seychelles footballer
Chris Dawson (governor), Australian police officer and governor
Christopher Dawson (1889–1970), British religion historian
Chris Dawson (rugby league), Australian rugby league player and convicted murderer